Sébastien Piccardo (22 January 1905 – 26 July 1983) was a French racing cyclist. He rode in the 1928 Tour de France.

References

1905 births
1983 deaths
French male cyclists
Place of birth missing